The Suffolk Family History Society is a genealogical association in Suffolk, England. It was founded in 1975.

Background
It is a registered charity and a member of the Federation of Family History Societies. It has several local groups meeting in communities throughout Suffolk, and it publishes a quarterly Suffolk family history journal, Suffolk Roots. An Interest group also meets in the West of London.

The Society has 2200 members world-wide.

Mission
The Society seeks "to promote and encourage the public study of British family history, genealogy, heraldry and local history with particular reference to Suffolk; and to promote the preservation, security and accessibility of archival material."

References
BBC February 2, 2006: Huge interest in family history - BBC Radio Suffolk's Family History Day at Kesgrave High School attracted over 1500 visitors.

External links
Suffolk Family History Society Official site

Family history societies in the United Kingdom
Organizations established in 1975
Organisations based in Suffolk
1975 establishments in England